Denice Andrée is a Swedish model and beauty queen who was crowned Miss International Sweden in 2011 and Miss Earth Sweden in 2013. In 2011, Denice represented Sweden in Miss International 2011 held in China and placed in the Top 15, in August 2013, she was handpicked to represent Sweden at Miss Earth 2013.

In 2015, she is participating in the Sjuan show Robinson: Love Edition.

References

Swedish beauty pageant winners
Swedish female models
Living people
Miss Earth 2013 contestants
Miss International 2011 delegates
Year of birth missing (living people)